Oceania is a geographical region that is described as a continent in some parts of the world. It includes Australasia, Melanesia, Micronesia, and Polynesia. While in most of the English-speaking world Oceania is described as a geographical region, outside of the English-speaking world Oceania is described as one of the continents. In this model of the world, Australia is only seen as an island nation contained inside of the continent of Oceania, and not a continent by itself. When compared to the other continents, Oceania is the smallest in land area and the second least populated after Antarctica.

Oceania has a diverse mix of economies from the highly developed and globally competitive financial markets of Australia, French Polynesia, Hawaii, New Caledonia, and New Zealand, which rank high in quality of life and Human Development Index, to the much less developed economies of Kiribati, Papua New Guinea, Tuvalu, Vanuatu, and Western New Guinea, while also including medium-sized economies of Pacific islands such as Fiji, Palau, and Tonga. The largest and most populous country in Oceania is Australia, and the largest city is Sydney.

The first settlers of Australia, New Guinea, and the large islands just to the east arrived more than 60,000 years ago. Oceania was first explored by Europeans from the 16th century onward. Portuguese explorers, between 1512 and 1526, reached the Tanimbar Islands, some of the Caroline Islands and west New Guinea. Spanish and Dutch explorers followed, then British and French. On his first voyage in the 18th century, James Cook, who later arrived at the highly developed Hawaiian Islands, went to Tahiti and followed the east coast of Australia for the first time.

The arrival of European settlers in subsequent centuries resulted in a significant alteration in the social and political landscape of Oceania. The Pacific theatre saw major action during the Second World War, mainly between Allied powers the United States, Philippines (a U.S. Commonwealth at the time) and Australia, and Axis power Japan. The rock art of Aboriginal Australians is the longest continuously practiced artistic tradition in the world. Most Oceanian countries are multi-party representative parliamentary democracies, with tourism being a large source of income for the Pacific Islands nations.

Definitions and extent

Characteristics

Definitions of Oceania vary. The broadest definition of Oceania encompasses the many islands between mainland Asia and the Americas; The island nation of Australia is the only piece of land in the area which is large enough to typically be considered a continent. The culture of the people who lived on these islands was often distinct from that of Asia and pre-Columbian America, hence a lack of association with either. Before Europeans arrived in the area, the sea shielded Australia and south central Pacific islands from cultural influences that spread through large continental landmasses and adjacent islands. The islands of the Malay archipelago, north of Australia, mainly lie on the continental shelf of Asia, and their inhabitants had more exposure to mainland Asian culture as a result of this closer proximity. The island of Taiwan similarly lies on the continental shelf of Asia, with their inhabitants historically having had exchange with mainland Asia.

The geographer Conrad Malte-Brun coined the French expression Terres océaniques (Oceanic lands)  1804, then in 1814 another French cartographer, Adrien-Hubert Brué, coined from this expression the shorter "Océanie" putting it on a map, "Océanie, ou cinquième partie du monde, comprenant l'archipel d'Asie, l'Australasie et la Polynésie (ou le continent de la Nouvelle Hollande et les îles du Grand Océan)". Océanie derives from the Latin word , and this from the Greek word  (ōkeanós), "ocean". The term Oceania is used because, unlike the other continental groupings, it is the ocean that links the parts of the region together. John Eperjesi's 2005 book The Imperialist Imaginary: Visions of Asia and the Pacific in American Culture says that it has "been used by western cartographers since the mid-19th century to give order to the complexities of the Pacific area." The Handbook of Religion (2014) states that it was "introduced by westerners" and in the 19th century helped describe "a sociopolitical reality of the islands of the southwest Pacific and Australia."

In the 19th century, many geographers divided up Oceania into mostly racially based subdivisions; Australasia, Malesia (encompassing the Malay archipelago), Melanesia, Micronesia and Polynesia. The 2011 book Maritime Adaptations of the Pacific, by Richard W. Casteel and Jean-Claude Passeron, states that, "for the purpose of anthropology, Oceania has long been a continent like Africa, Asia and America." Scottish geographer John Bartholomew wrote in 1873 that, "the New World consists of North America, and the peninsula of South America attached to it. These divisions [are] generally themselves spoken as continents, and to them has been added another, embracing the large island of Australia and numerous others in the [Pacific] Ocean, under the name of Oceania. There are thus six great divisions of the earth — Europe, Asia, Africa, North America, South America and Oceania." American author Samuel Griswold Goodrich wrote in his 1854 book History of All Nations that, "geographers have agreed to consider the island world of the Pacific Ocean as a third continent, under the name Oceania." In this book the other two continents were categorized as being the New World (consisting of the Americas) and the Old World (consisting of Afro-Eurasia). One study from 1884 describes Oceania as a continent, stating that “South of the continent of Asia is found a large island nearly as large as the continent of Europe. This, with a great number of small islands in the neighbourhood, is regarded as forming a fourth continent known as Oceania.” Other studies from the early twentieth Century also described Oceania as a continent. In his 1879 book Australasia, British naturalist Alfred Russel Wallace commented that, "Oceania is the word often used by continental geographers to describe the great world of islands we are now entering upon" and that "Australia forms its central and most important feature." He did not explicitly label Oceania a continent in the book, but did note that it was one of the six major divisions of the world. The Oxford Handbook of World History (2011) describes the areas encompassed in Oceania as being "afterthoughts in world history texts, lumped together and included at the end of global surveys as areas largely marginal to the main events of world history".

In most non-English speaking countries Oceania is treated as a continent in the sense that it is "one of the parts of the world", and Australia is only seen as an island nation. While in other non-English speaking countries Australia and Eurasia are thought of as continents, while Asia, Europe, and Oceania are regarded as "parts of the world". Prior to the 1950s, before the popularization of the theory of plate tectonics, Antarctica, Australia and Greenland were sometimes described as island continents, but none were usually taught as one of the world's continents in English-speaking countries. In her 1961 book The United States and the Southwest Pacific, American author Clinton Hartley Grattan commented that, "the use of the word Oceania to cover Australia, New Zealand, and the [Pacific] islands now has a slightly old-fashioned flavor." Australia is a founding member of the Pacific Islands Forum in 1971, and at times has been interpreted as the largest Pacific island. For example, Tony deBrum, Foreign Minister for the Marshall Islands, stated in 2014, "not only [is Australia] our big brother down south, Australia is a member of the Pacific Islands Forum and Australia is a Pacific island, a big island, but a Pacific island." Some geographers group the Australian tectonic plate with others in the Pacific to form a geological continent. National Geographic states that the term Oceania "establishes the Pacific Ocean as the defining characteristic of the continent." Others have labelled it as the "liquid continent". The Pacific Ocean itself has been labelled as a "continent of islands", and contains approximately 25,000, which is more than all the other major oceans combined. In a 1991 article for the Submerged Resources Center, American archeologist Toni L. Carrell wrote, "the immensity of and great distances within the Pacific Basin often make it difficult to conceptualize the basin as a single earth feature." She adds that most islands in the Pacific are "close enough together to be easily clustered into archipelagos or groups. The notable exceptions, those islands more than 400 statute miles from any other, are: Clipperton Island, Easter Island, Salas y Gómez, Johnston Atoll, Norfolk Island, Marcus Island and Parece Vela." In his 2013 book Reptiles and Amphibians of the Pacific Islands: A Comprehensive Guide, American herpetologist George R. Zug wrote, "what is and is not part of the Pacific—particularly the western Pacific—is variously delimited", adding that "a majority viewpoint accepts the landmasses of Japan, Taiwan, the Philippines, New Guinea, and eastern Australia, which face the open waters of the Pacific, as its western edge." Islands in Indonesia's North Maluku and North Sulawesi regions are considered to border the open Pacific Ocean, with the rest of the Indonesian islands being located in marginal seas of the Pacific, or the Indian Ocean. Oceania's subregions of Australasia, Melanesia, Micronesia, and Polynesia cover two major plates; the Australian Plate (also known as the Indo-Australian Plate) and the Pacific Plate, in addition to two minor plates; the Nazca Plate and the Philippine Sea Plate. The Australian Plate includes Australia, New Caledonia, Papua New Guinea, Fiji, Vanuatu, and parts of New Zealand. The Pacific Plate covers the Solomon Islands and parts of New Zealand, as well as Micronesia (excluding the westernmost islands near the Philippine Sea Plate) and Polynesia (excluding Easter Island). The Nazca Plate, which includes Easter Island, neighbors the South American Plate, and is still considered to be a separate tectonic plate, despite only containing a handful of islands.

The new terms Near Oceania and Remote Oceania were proposed in 1973 by anthropologists Roger Green and Andrew Pawley. By their definition, Near Oceania consists of New Guinea, the Bismarck Archipelago and the Solomon Islands, with the exception of Santa Cruz Islands. They are designed to dispel the outdated categories of Melanesia, Micronesia, and Polynesia; Near Oceania cuts right across the old category of Melanesia, which has shown to be not a pertinent category in respect to the geography, archeology, culture, language and human history of the region. The old categories have been in use since they were proposed in 1832 by French explorer Jules Dumont d'Urville. Many scholars now replace those categories with Green's terms since the early 1990s, but the old categories are still used in science, popular culture and general usage.

Boundaries

Islands at the geographic extremes of Oceania are generally considered to be the Bonin Islands, a politically integral part of Japan; Hawaii, a state of the United States; Clipperton Island, a possession of France; the Juan Fernández Islands, belonging to Chile; and Macquarie Island, belonging to Australia.

United Nations interpretation
The United Nations (UN) has used its own geopolitical definition of Oceania since its foundation in 1947, which utilizes four of the five subregions from the 19th century; Australasia, Melanesia, Micronesia, and Polynesia. This definition consists of discrete political entities, and so excludes the Bonin Islands, Hawaii, Clipperton Island and the Juan Fernández Islands, along with Easter Island — which was annexed by Chile in 1888. It is used in statistical reports, by the International Olympic Committee, and by many atlases. The UN categorizes Oceania, and by extension the Pacific area, as one of the major continental divisions of the world, along with Africa, Asia, Europe and the Americas. Their definition includes American Samoa, Australia and their external territories, the Cook Islands, Federated States of Micronesia, French Polynesia, Fiji, Guam, Kiribati, the Marshall Islands, Nauru, New Caledonia, New Zealand, Niue, the Northern Mariana Islands, Palau, Papua New Guinea, Pitcairn Islands, Samoa, the Solomon Islands, Tokelau, Tonga, Tuvalu, Vanuatu, Wallis and Futuna, and the United States Minor Outlying Islands (Baker Island, Howland Island, Jarvis Island, Midway Atoll, Palmyra Atoll, and Wake Island). The original UN definition of Oceania from 1947 included these same countries and semi-independent territories, which were mostly still colonies at that point. Hawaii had not yet become a U.S. state in 1947, and as such was part of the original UN definition of Oceania. The island states of Indonesia, Japan, the Philippines, Singapore and Taiwan, all located within the bounds of the Pacific or associated marginal seas, are excluded from the UN definition. The states of Hong Kong and Malaysia, located in both mainland Asia and marginal seas of the Pacific, are also excluded, as is the nation of Brunei, which shares the island of Borneo with Indonesia and Malaysia. Further excluded are East Timor and Indonesian New Guinea/Western New Guinea, areas which are biogeographically or geologically associated with the Australian landmass. The CIA World Factbook also categorizes Oceania as one of the major continental divisions of the world, but the name "Australia and Oceania" is used. Their definition does not include all of Australia's external territories, but is otherwise the same as the UN's definition, and is also used for statistical purposes. In a 2008 article for the India Quarterly journal titled Oceania and Security: A Perspective from New Zealand, author Peter Cozens stated, "the region of Oceania is characterised by vast distances across the sea between continental land masses [...] It is difficult to be precise about the term Oceania and its exact delimitation", adding that "the principal regional political grouping is contained within the Pacific Island Forum (PIF) - the 16 states making up the Forum are: Australia, Cook Islands, Federated States of Micronesia, Fiji, Kiribati, Marshall Islands, Nauru, New Zealand, Niue, Palau, Papua New Guinea, Samoa, Solomon Islands, Tonga, Tuvalu and Vanuatu - in general terms this is the area referred to as Oceania by the United Nations and similar agencies." The Pacific Islands Forum expanded during the early 2010s, and areas that were already included in the UN definition of Oceania, such as French Polynesia, gained membership.

Early interpretations

French writer Gustave d'Eichthal remarked in 1844 that, "the boundaries of Oceania are in reality those of the great ocean itself." Conrad Malte-Brun in 1824 defined Oceania as covering Australia, New Zealand, the islands of Polynesia (which then included all the Pacific islands) and the Malay archipelago. American lexicographer Joseph Emerson Worcester wrote in 1840 that Oceania is "a term applied to a vast number of islands which are widely dispersed in the Pacific Ocean […] they are considered as forming a fifth grand division of the world." He also viewed Oceania as covering Australia, New Zealand, the Malay archipelago and the islands of Melanesia, Micronesia and Polynesia. In 1887, the Royal Asiatic Society of Great Britain and Ireland referred to Australia as the area's westernmost land, while in 1870, British Reverend Alexander Mackay identified the Bonin Islands as its northernmost point, and Macquarie Island as its southernmost point. The Bonin Islands (adjacent to Micronesia) at that time were a possession of Britain; Macquarie Island, to the south of Tasmania, is a subantarctic island in the Pacific. It was politically associated with Australia and Tasmania by 1870.

Alfred Russel Wallace believed in 1879 that Oceania extended to the Aleutian Islands, which are among the northernmost islands of the Pacific. The islands, now politically associated with Alaska, have historically had inhabitants that were related to Indigenous Americans, in addition to having non-tropical biogeography similar to that of Alaska and Siberia. Wallace insisted while the surface area of this wide definition was greater than that of Asia and Europe combined, the land area was only a little greater than that of Europe. American geographer Sophia S. Cornell claimed that the Aleutian Islands were not part of Oceania in 1857. She stated that Oceania was divided up into three groups; Australasia (which included Australia, New Zealand and the Melanesian islands), Malesia (which included all present-day countries within the Malay archipelago, not the modern country of Malaysia) and Polynesia (which included both the Polynesian and Micronesian islands in her definition). Aside from mainland Australia, areas that she identified as of high importance were Borneo, Hawaii, Indonesia's Java and Sumatra, New Guinea, New Zealand, the Philippines, French Polynesia's Society Islands, Tasmania, and Tonga.

American geographer Jesse Olney's 1845 book A Practical System of Modern Geography stated that it "comprises the numerous isles of the Pacific, lying south east of Asia." Olney divided up Oceania into three groups; Australasia (which included Australia, New Guinea and New Zealand), Malesia and Polynesia (which included the combined islands of Melanesia, Micronesia and Polynesia in his definition). Publication Missionary Review of the World claimed in 1895 that Oceania was divided up into five groups; Australasia, Malesia, Melanesia, Micronesia and Polynesia. It did not consider Hawaii to be part of Polynesia, due to its geographic isolation, commenting that Oceania also included, "isolated groups and islands, such as the Hawaiian and Galápagos." In his 1876 book The Earth and Its Inhabitants: Oceanica, French geographer Élisée Reclus labelled Australia's flora as "one of the most characteristic on the globe", adding that "the Hawaiian archipelago also constitutes a separate vegetation zone; of all tropical insular groups it possesses the relatively largest number of endemic plants. In the Galápagos group also more than half of the species are of local origin." Rand McNally & Company, an American publisher of maps and atlases, claimed in 1892 that, "Oceania comprises the large island of Australia and the innumerable islands of the Pacific Ocean" and also that the islands of the Malay archipelago "should be grouped in with Asia." British linguist Robert Needham Cust argued in 1887 that the Malay archipelago should be excluded since it had participated in Asian civilization. Cust considered Oceania's four subregions to be Australasia, Melanesia, Micronesia and Polynesia. New Zealand were categorized by him as being in Polynesia; and the only country in his definition of Australasia was Australia. His definition of Polynesia included both Easter Island and Hawaii, which had not yet been annexed by either Chile or the United States.

The Journal of the Royal Statistical Society stated in 1892 that Australia was a large island within Oceania rather than a small continent. It additionally commented, "it is certainly not necessary to consider the Hawaiian Islands and Australia as being in the same part of the world, it is however permissible to unite in one group all the islands which are scattered over the great ocean. It should be remarked that if we take the Malay archipelago away from Oceania, as do generally the German geographers, the insular world contained in the great ocean is cut in two, and the least populated of the five parts of the world is diminished in order to increase the number of inhabitants of the most densely populated continent." Regarding Australia and the Pacific, Chambers's New Handy Volume American Encyclopædia observed in 1885 that, "the whole region has sometimes been called Oceania, and sometimes Australasia—generally, however, in modern times, to the exclusion of the islands in the [Malay] archipelago, to which certain writers have given the name of Malesia." It added there was controversy over the exact limits of Oceania, saying that, "scarcely any two geographers appear to be quite agreed upon the subject". British physician and ethnologist James Cowles Prichard claimed in 1847 that the Aleutian Islands and the Kuril Islands form "the northern boundary of this fifth region of the world, and with the coasts of Asia and America completing its literal termination." However, he wrote that these islands "are not usually reckoned as belonging to it, because they are known to be inhabited by races of people who came immediately from the adjacent continents and are unconnected with those tribes of the human race who peopled the remote islands of this great ocean." He added that Hawaii was the most northerly area to be inhabited by races associated with Oceania.

The 1926 book Modern World History, 1776-1926: A Survey of the Origins and Development of Contemporary Civilization, by Alexander Clarence Flick, considered Oceania to include all islands in the Pacific, and associated the term with the Malay archipelago, the islands of Melanesia, Micronesia and Polynesia, the Aleutian Islands, Japan's Ryukyu Islands, Taiwan (then known as Formosa) and the Kuril Islands (currently administered by Russia, but which were then partly split between Japan and Russia). He further included in his definition Sakhalin, an island which is geologically part of the Japanese archipelago, but that has been administered by Russia since World War II. It is located within a marginal sea of the Pacific (the Sea of Okhotsk), unlike the rest of the Japanese archipelago and the neighboring Kuril Islands, which border the open Pacific Ocean. Hong Kong, partly located in another marginal sea of the Pacific (the South China Sea) was also included in his definition. Australia and New Zealand were grouped together by Flick as Australasia, and categorized as being in the same area of the world as the islands of Oceania. Flick estimated this definition of Oceania had a population of 70,000,000, and commented that, "brown and yellow races constitute the vast majority" and that the minority of whites were mainly "owners and rulers". He added, "through trade relations, the work of missionaries and teachers, and political control, western civilization is slowly penetrating these out of the way places either directly, or indirectly through Europeanized powers like Japan." Hutton Webster's 1919 book Medieval and Modern History  also considered Oceania to encompass all islands in the Pacific, stating that, "the term Oceania, or Oceanica, in its widest sense applies to all the Pacific Islands." Webster broke Oceania up into two subdivisions; the continental group, which included Australia, the Japanese archipelago, the Malay archipelago and Taiwan, and the oceanic group, which included New Zealand and the islands of Melanesia, Micronesia and Polynesia. In his 1846 book A Universal Pronouncing Gazetteer, author Thomas Baldwin wrote that Oceania includes Australia and Pacific islands which "are considered, from their proximity, not to belong to the continents of Asia or America." He defined Oceania as including the Malay archipelago, but not Japan or Taiwan, and noted that "its limits are somewhat indefinite."

Charles Marion Tyler's 1885 book The Island World of the Pacific Ocean considered Oceania to ethnographically encompass Australia, New Zealand, the Malay archipelago and the islands of Melanesia, Micronesia and Polynesia. However, Tyler included other Pacific islands in his book as well, such as the Aleutian Islands, the Bonin Islands, the Japanese archipelago, the Juan Fernández Islands, the Kuril Islands, the Ryukyu Islands, Taiwan, California's Channel Islands and Farallon Islands, Canada's Vancouver Island and Queen Charlotte Islands (now known as Haida Gwaii), Chile's Chiloé Island, Ecuador's Galápagos Islands, Mexico's Guadalupe Island, Revillagigedo Islands, San Benito Islands and Tres Marías Islands, and Peru's Chincha Islands. Islands in marginal seas of the Pacific were also covered in the book, including Alaska's Pribilof Islands (located to the north of the Aleutian chain in the subarctic Bering Sea) and China's Hainan (located in the South China Sea). Tyler additionally profiled the Anson archipelago, which during the 19th century was a designation for a widely scattered group of purported islands in the Northwestern Pacific Ocean between Japan and Hawaii. The Anson archipelago included phantom islands such as Ganges Island and Los Jardines which were proven to not exist, as well as real islands such as Marcus Island and Wake Island. Tyler described Australia as "the leviathan of the island groups of the world", and stated that the Juan Fernández Islands "will always retain a marked prominence in island histories, being at one time the home of that celebrated castaway Alexander Selkirk, whose life and adventures have been made so intensely interesting to youthful minds, and older ones too, for that matter, by Defoe in his wonderful book Robinson Crusoe." In his 1857 book A Treatise on Physical Geography, Francis B. Fogg commented that "the Pacific and its dependencies may be said to contain that portion of the globe termed Oceanica or 'the Maritime World', which is divided into Australasia, Malesia and Polynesia." Fogg defined Polynesia as covering the combined islands of Melanesia, Micronesia and Polynesia, as well as the Ryukyu Islands. He added that, "besides the proceeding, the Pacific contains many other islands, of which the most important are Hainan and Formosa, on the coast of China, the Japan isles, the Kuriles, the Aleutian Islands (stretching from the New World to the Old), Vancouver Island, the Galápagos, Juan Fernández and Chiloé." Scottish academic John Merry Ross in 1879 considered Polynesia to cover the entire South and Central Pacific area, not just islands ethnographically within Polynesia. He wrote in The Globe Encyclopedia of Universal Information that, "literally interpreted, the name would include all the groups from Sumatra to the Galápagos, together with Australia." Ross further wrote, "and to this vast region the term Oceania has been applied. It is more usual at the present time, however, to exclude the [Malay] archipelago."

Historical and contemporary interpretations
In a 1972 article for the Music Educators Journal titled Musics of Oceania, author Raymond F. Kennedy wrote, "many meanings have been given to the word Oceania. The most inclusive–but not always the most useful–embraces about 25,000 land areas between Asia and the Americas. A more popular and practical definition excludes Indonesia, East Malaysia (Borneo), the Philippines, Taiwan, Japan and other islands closely related to the Asian mainland, as well as the Aleutians and the small island groups situated near the Americas. Thus, Oceania most commonly refers to the land areas of the South and Central Pacific." Kennedy defined Oceania as including Australasia, Melanesia, Micronesia, and Polynesia. The U.S. Government Publishing Office's Area Handbook for Oceania from 1971 states that Australia and New Zealand are the principal large sovereignties of the area. It further states, "In its broadest definition Oceania embraces all islands and island groups of the Pacific Ocean that lie between Asia and the two American continents. In popular usage, however, the designation has a more restricted application. The islands of the North Pacific, such as the Aleutians and the Kuriles, usually are excluded. In addition, the series of sovereign island nations fringing Asia (Japan, Taiwan, the Philippines, East Malaysia, the Republic of Indonesia) are not ordinarily considered to be part of the area." In 1948, American military journal Armed Forces Talk broke the islands of the Pacific up into five major subdivisions; Indonesia, Melanesia, Micronesia, Polynesia and the non-tropical Islands. The Indonesia subdivision consisted of the islands of the Malay archipelago, while the non-tropical islands were categorized as being North Pacific islands such as Alaska's Kodiak archipelago, the Aleutian Islands, Japan, the Kuril Islands and Sakhalin. Japan's Bonin and Ryukyu Islands are also considered to be subtropical islands, with the main Japanese archipelago being non-tropical. The journal associated the term Oceania with the Melanesian, Micronesian and Polynesian subdivisions, but not with the Indonesian or non-tropical subdivisions. The Pacific Islands Handbook (1945), by Robert William Robson, stated that, "Pacific Islands generally are regarded as Pacific islands lying within the tropics. There are a considerable number of Pacific Islands outside the tropics. Most of them have little economic or political importance." He noted the political significance of the Aleutian Islands, which were invaded by the Japanese military in World War II, and categorized New Zealand's Antipodes Islands, Auckland Islands, Bounty Islands, Campbell Islands, Chatham Island and Kermadec Islands as being non-tropical islands of the South Pacific, along with Australia's Lord Howe Island and Norfolk Island. The Kermadec Islands, Lord Howe Island and Norfolk Island are also considered to be subtropical islands. Other non-tropical areas below the equator, such as Chiloé Island, Macquarie Island, Tasmania, and the southern portions of mainland Australia and New Zealand, were not included in this category.

According to the 1998 book Encyclopedia of Earth and Physical Sciences, Oceania refers to Australasia, Melanesia, Micronesia, Polynesia, and more than 10,000 islands scattered across the Pacific Ocean. It notes that, "the term [has] also come under scrutiny by many geographers. Some experts insist that Oceania encompasses even the cold Aleutian Islands and the islands of Japan. Disagreement also exists over whether or not Indonesia, the Philippines and Taiwan should be included in Oceania." The Japanese archipelago, the Malay archipelago and Taiwan and other islands near China are often deemed as a geological extension of Asia, since they do not have oceanic geology, instead being detached fragments of the Eurasian continent that were once physiologically connected. Certain Japanese islands off the main archipelago are not geologically associated with Asia. The book The World and Its Peoples: Australia, New Zealand, Oceania (1966) asserts that, "Japan, Taiwan, the Aleutian Islands, Indonesia, the Philippines and Malaysia [and] the Pacific archipelagos bordering upon the Far East Asian mainland are excluded from Oceania", and that "all the islands lying between Australia and the Americas, including Australia, are part of Oceania." Furthermore, the book adds that Hawaii is still within Oceania, despite being politically integrated into the U.S., and that the Pacific Ocean "gives unity to the whole" since "all these varied lands emerge from or border upon the Pacific."

The 1876 book The Countries of the World: Volume 4, by British scientist and explorer Robert Brown, labelled the Malay archipelago as Northwestern Oceania, but Brown still noted that these islands belonged more to the Asian continent. They are now often referred to as Maritime Southeast Asia, with Indonesia, Malaysia, the Philippines and Singapore being founding members of the ASEAN regional organization for Southeast Asia in 1967 (Brunei and East Timor did not exist as independent nations at that point). Brown also categorized Japan and Taiwan as being in the same part of the world as the islands of Oceania, and excluded them from The Countries of the World: Volume 5, which covered mainland Asia and Hong Kong. However, Brown did not explicitly associate Japan or Taiwan with the term Oceania. He divided Oceania into two subregions; Eastern Oceania, which included the islands of Melanesia, Micronesia and Polynesia, and Southwestern Oceania, which included Australia and New Zealand. The Galápagos Islands, the Juan Fernández Islands and the Revillagigedo Islands were identified as the easternmost areas of Oceania in the book. Brown wrote, "they lie nearest the American continent of all oceanic islands, and though rarely associated with Polynesia, and never appearing to have been inhabited by any aboriginal races, are, in many ways, remarkable and interesting." Brown went on to add, "the small islands lying off the continent, like the Queen Charlotte's in the North Pacific, the Farallones off California, and the Chinchas off Peru are — to all intents and purposes, only detached bits of the adjoining shores. But in the case of the Galápagos, at least, this is different." He also claimed that they are "often cited as illustrating the peculiar relation of such islands to continents. Mr. Darwin has, for instance, adducted them as an illustration of the fact that such islands are inhabited by plants and animals closely allied to those of the nearest mainland, without actually being the same." The Juan Fernández Islands and the neighboring Desventuradas Islands are today seen as the easternmost extension of the Indo-West Pacific biogeographic region. The islands lie on the Nazca Plate with Easter Island and the Galápagos Islands, and have a significant south central Pacific component to their marine fauna. According to scientific journal PLOS One, the Humboldt Current helps create a biogeographic barrier between the marine fauna of these islands and South America. Chile's government have occasionally considered them to be within Oceania along with Easter Island. Chile's government also categorize Easter Island, the Desventuradas Islands and the Juan Fernández Islands as being part of a region titled Insular Chile. They further include in this region Salas y Gómez, a small uninhabited island to the east of Easter Island. PLOS One describe Insular Chile as having "cultural and ecological connections to the broader insular Pacific."

In her 1997 book Australia and Oceania, Australian historian Kate Darian-Smith defined the area as covering Australia, New Zealand and the islands of the Melanesia, Micronesia and Polynesia. She excluded Hawaii from her definition, but not Easter Island. The International Union for Conservation of Nature stated in a 1986 report that they include Easter Island in their definition of Oceania "on the basis of its Polynesian and biogeographic affinities even though it is politically apart", further noting that other oceanic islands administered by Latin American countries had been included in definitions of Oceania. In 1987, The Journal of Australasian Cave Research described Oceania as being "the region from Irian Jaya (Western New Guinea, a province of New Guinea) in the west to Galápagos Islands (Equador) and Easter Island (Chile) in the east." In a 1980 report on venereal diseases in the South Pacific, the British Journal of Venereal Diseases categorized the Desventuradas Islands, Easter Island, the Galápagos Islands and the Juan Fernández Islands as being in an eastern region of the South Pacific, along with areas such as Pitcairn Islands and French Polynesia, but noted that the Galápagos Islands were not a member of the South Pacific Commission, like other islands in the South Pacific. The South Pacific Commission is a developmental organization formed in 1947 and is currently known as the Pacific Community; its members include Australia and other Pacific Islands Forum members. In a 1947 article on the formation of the South Pacific Commission for the Pacific Affairs journal, author Roy E. James stated the organization's scope encompassed all non-self governing islands below the equator to the east of Papua New Guinea (which itself was included in the scope and then known as Dutch New Guinea). Easter Island and the Galápagos Islands were defined by James as falling within the organization's geographical parameters. The 2007 book Asia in the Pacific Islands: Replacing the West, by New Zealand Pacific scholar Ron Crocombe, defined the term "Pacific Islands" as being islands in the South Pacific Commission, and stated that such a definition "does not include Galápagos and other [oceanic] islands off the Pacific coast of the Americas; these were uninhabited when Europeans arrived, then integrated with a South American country and have almost no contact with other Pacific Islands." He adds, "Easter Island still participates in some Pacific Island affairs because its people are Polynesian."

Thomas Sebeok's two volume 1971 book Linguistics in Oceania defines Easter Island, the Galápagos Islands, the Juan Fernández Islands, Costa Rica's Cocos Island and Colombia's Malpelo Island (all oceanic) as making up a Spanish language segment of Oceania. Cocos Island and Malpelo Island are the only landmasses located on the Cocos Plate, which is to the north of the Nazca Plate. The book observed that a native Polynesian language was still understood on Easter Island, unlike with the other islands, which were uninhabited when discovered by Europeans and mostly being used as prisons for convicts. Additionally, the book includes Taiwan and the entire Malay archipelago as part of Oceania. While not oceanic in nature, Taiwan and Malay archipelago countries like Indonesia and the Philippines share Austronesian ethnolinguistic origins with Melanesia, Micronesia and Polynesia, hence their inclusion in the book. Hainan, which neighbors Taiwan, also has Austronesian ethnolinguistic origins, although it was not included in the book. The book defined Oceania's major subregions as being Australia, Indonesia (which included all areas associated with the Malay archipelago), Melanesia, Micronesia and Polynesia. In 2010, Australian historian Bronwen Douglas claimed in The Journal of Pacific History that "a strong case could be made for extending Oceania to at least Taiwan, the homeland of the Austronesian language family whose speakers colonized significant parts of the region about 6,000 years ago." For political reasons, Taiwan was a member of the Oceania Football Confederation during the 1970s and 1980s, rather than the Asian Football Confederation.

Ian Todd's 1974 book Island Realm: A Pacific Panorama also defines oceanic Latin American islands as making up a Spanish language segment of Oceania, and included the Desventuradas Islands, Easter Island, the Galápagos Islands, Guadalupe Island, the Juan Fernández Islands, the Revillagigedo Islands and Salas y Gómez. Cocos Island and Malpelo Island were not explicitly referenced in the book, despite being areas which would fall within this range. All other islands associated with Latin American countries were excluded, as they are continental in nature, unlike Guadalupe Island and the Revillagigedo Islands (both situated on the Pacific Plate) and the oceanic islands situated on the Cocos Plate and Nazca Plate. Todd defined the oceanic Bonin Islands as making up a Japanese language segment of Oceania, and excluded the main Japanese archipelago. Todd further included the Aleutian Islands in his definition of Oceania. The island chain borders both the Pacific Plate and the North American Plate, and is geologically a partially submerged volcanic extension of the Aleutian Range on the Alaskan mainland, that stretches for another 1,600 kilometers. He did not include the volcanic Kuril Islands and Ryukyu Islands, which similarly border both the Eurasian Plate and the Pacific Plate, nor did he include the neighboring Kodiak archipelago in the North Pacific Ocean, which is firmly situated on the North American Plate. The Stockholm Journal of East Asian Studies stated in 1996 that Oceania was defined as Australia and an ensemble of various Pacific Islands, "particularly those in the central and south Pacific [but] never those in the extreme north, for example the Aleutian chain." In the Pacific Ocean Handbook (1945), author Eliot Grinnell Mears claimed, "it is customary to exclude the Aleutians of the North Pacific, the American coastal islands and the Netherlands East Indies", and that he included Australia and New Zealand in Oceania for "scientific reasons; Australia's fauna is largely continental in character, New Zealand's are clearly insular; and neither Commonwealth realm has close ties with Asia." In his 2002 book Oceania: An Introduction to the Cultures and Identities of Pacific Islanders, Andrew Strathern excluded Okinawa and the rest of the Ryukyu Islands from his definition of Oceania, but noted that the islands and their indigenous inhabitants "show many parallels with Pacific island societies."

In his 1994 book Familia Gekkonidae (Reptilia, Sauria). Part 1: Australia and Oceania, German herpetologist Klaus Henle referred to the area as the Pacific region, and defined it as covering Australia, New Zealand and the islands of Melanesia, Micronesia and Polynesia. Henle included the Indonesian half of New Guinea, but excluded the rest of Indonesia and the Malay archipelago, as well as all Japanese islands and oceanic Latin American islands (with the exception of Easter Island). In the 2006 book Extinction and Biogeography of Tropical Pacific Birds, American paleontologist David Steadman wrote, "no place on earth is as perplexing as the 25,000 islands that make Oceania." Steadman viewed Oceania as encompassing Melanesia, Micronesia and Polynesia (including Easter Island and Hawaii). He excluded from his definition the larger islands of New Guinea and New Zealand, and argued that Cocos Island, the Galápagos Islands, the Revillagigedo Islands and other oceanic islands nearing the Americas were not part of Oceania, due to their biogeographical affinities with that area and lack of prehistoric indigenous populations. In his 2018 book Regionalism in South Pacific, Chinese author Yu Changsen wrote that some "stress a narrow vision of the Pacific as those Pacific Islands excluding Australia and even sometimes New Zealand", adding that the term Oceania "promotes a broader concept that has room for Australia and New Zealand."

American marine geologist Anthony A. P. Koppers wrote in the 2009 book Encyclopedia of Islands that, "as a whole, the islands of the Pacific Region are referred to as Oceania, the tenth continent on earth. Inherent to their remoteness and because of the wide variety of island types, the Pacific Islands have developed unique social, biological and geological characteristics." Koppers considered Oceania to encompass the entire 25,000 islands of the Pacific Ocean. In this book, he included the Aleutian Islands, the Galápagos Islands, the Japanese archipelago, the Kuril Islands and continental islands off the coast of the Americas such as the Channel Islands, the Farallon Islands and Vancouver Island; all of these islands lie in or close to the Pacific Ring of Fire, as is the case with New Guinea and New Zealand, which were also included. In the 2013 book The Environments of the Poor in Southeast Asia, East Asia and the Pacific, Paul Bullen critiqued the definition of Oceania in Encyclopedia of Islands, and wrote that since Koppers included areas such as Vancouver Island, it is "not clear what the referents of 'Pacific Region', 'Oceania' or 'Pacific Islands' are." Bullen added that, "Asia, Europe and the Maritime Continent are not literal geographic continents. The 'Asia-Pacific region' would comprise two quasi-continents. 'The Pacific' would not refer to the Pacific Ocean and everything in it e.g., the Philippines." The Concise Oxford Dictionary of World Place Names (2017), by John Everett-Heath, states that Oceania is "a collective name for more than 10,000 islands in the Pacific Ocean" and that "it is generally accepted that Indonesia, Japan, the Philippines, Taiwan, and the islands north of Japan (the Kurils and Aleutians) are excluded." In his 1993 book A New Oceania: Rediscovering Our Sea of Islands, New Guinea-born Fijian scholar Epeli Hauʻofa wrote that, "Pacific Ocean islands from Japan, through the Philippines and Indonesia, which are adjacent to the Asian mainland, do not have oceanic cultures, and are therefore not part of Oceania."

The Oxford Handbook of Prehistoric Oceania (2018) defined Oceania as only covering Austronesian-speaking islands in Melanesia, Micronesia and Polynesia, with this definition including New Guinea and New Zealand. Other Austronesian areas such as Indonesia and the Philippines were not included, due to their closer cultural proximity to mainland Asia. Australia was also not included, as it was settled several thousands of years before the arrival of Austronesian-speaking peoples in Melanesia, Micronesia and Polynesia. The book stated, "this definition of Oceania might seem too restrictive: Why not include Australia, for example, or even too broad, for what does Highland New Guinea have to do with Hawai'i?", further noting that, "a few other islands in the Pacific such as those of Japan or the Channel Islands off the southern California coast are not typically considered Oceania as the indigenous populations of these places do not share a common ancestry with Oceanic groups, except for a time far before humans sailed Pacific waters." It has been theorized that the indigenous Jōmon people of the Japanese archipelago are related to Austronesians, along with the indigenous inhabitants of the Ryukyu Islands. Some also theorize that Indigenous Australians are related to the Ainu people, who are the original inhabitants of Japan's Hokkaido, the Kuril Islands and the southern part of Sakhalin. In their 2019 book Women and Violence: Global Lives in Focus, Kathleen Nadeau and Sangita Rayamajhi wrote that, "the Philippines, Malaysia, Brunei, and most of Indonesia are not usually considered to be part of the region of Oceania as it is understood today. These regions are usually considered to be part of Maritime Southeast Asia. Although these regions, as well as the large East Asian islands of Taiwan, Hainan and the Japanese archipelago, have varying degrees of cultural connections."

In Reptiles and Amphibians of the Pacific Islands: A Comprehensive Guide (2013), George R. Zug claimed that "a standard definition of Oceania includes Australia, Papua New Guinea, the Solomon Islands, New Caledonia, and New Zealand and the oceanic islands of Polynesia, Micronesia, and Melanesia." He went on to write that his preferred definition of Oceania emphasis islands with oceanic geology, stating that oceanic islands are, "islands with no past connections to a continental landmass" and that, "these boundaries encompass the Hawaiian and Bonin Islands in the north and Easter Island in the south, and the Palau Islands in the west to the Galápagos Islands in the east." Australia, New Guinea, New Zealand and New Caledonia (which is geologically associated with New Zealand) were all excluded, as these areas are descendants of the ancient Pangaea supercontinent, along with landmasses such as the Americas and Afro-Eurasia. Volcanic islands which are geologically associated with continental landmasses, such as the Aleutian Islands, Japan's Izu Islands, the Kuril Islands, the Ryukyu Islands and most of the Solomon Islands, were also excluded from his definition. Unlike the United Nations, the World Factbook defines the still-uninhabited Clipperton Island as being a discrete political entity, and they categorize it as part of North America, presumably due to its relative proximity (situated 1,200 kilometers off Mexico on the Pacific Plate). Clipperton is not politically associated with the Americas, as is the case with other oceanic islands nearing the Americas, having had almost no interaction with the continent throughout its history. From the early 20th century to 2007, the island was administratively part of French Polynesia, which itself was known as French Oceania up until 1957. In terms of marine fauna, Clipperton shares similarities with areas of the Pacific which are much farther removed from the Americas. Scottish author Robert Hope Moncrieff considered Clipperton to be the easternmost point of Oceania in 1907, while Ian Todd also included it in his definition of Oceania in Island Realm: A Pacific Panorama.

Other uninhabited Pacific Ocean landmasses have been explicitly associated with Oceania, including the highly remote Baker Island and Wake Island (now administered by the U.S. military). This is due to their location in the center of the Pacific, their biogeography and their oceanic geology. Less isolated oceanic islands that were once uninhabited, such as the Bonin Islands, the Galápagos Islands and the Juan Fernández Islands, have since been sparsely populated by citizens of their political administrators. Archaeological evidence suggests that Micronesians may have lived on the Bonin Islands  years ago, but they were uninhabited at the time of European discovery in the 16th century.

Boundaries between subregions
Depending on the definition, New Zealand could be part of Polynesia, or part of Australasia with Australia. New Zealand was originally settled by the Polynesian Māori, and has long maintained a political influence over the subregion. Through immigration and high Māori birth rates, New Zealand has attained the largest population of Polynesians in the world, while Australia has the third largest Polynesian population (consisting entirely of immigrants). Modern-day Indigenous Australians are loosely related to Melanesians, and Australia maintains political influence over Melanesia, which is mostly located on the same tectonic plate. Despite this, Australia is rarely seen as a part of the subregion. As with Australia and New Zealand, Melanesia's New Caledonia has a significant non-indigenous European population, numbering around 71,000. Conversely, New Caledonia has still had a similar history to the rest of Melanesia, and their French-speaking Europeans make up only 27% of the total population. As such, it is not also culturally considered a part of the predominantly English-speaking Australasia. Some cultural and political definitions of Australasia include most or all of Melanesia, due to its geographical proximity to Australia and New Zealand, but these are rare. Australia, New Zealand and the islands of Melanesia are more commonly grouped together as part of the Australasian biogeographical realm. The UN's name for the Australasia subregion is "Australia and New Zealand"; their definition includes New Zealand, but places Papua New Guinea in Melanesia. Papua New Guinea is geographically the closest country to Australia, and is often geologically associated with Australia as it was once physiologically connected. The UN's definition of this subregion also includes Australia's Indian Ocean external territories of Christmas Island and Cocos (Keeling) Islands. These tropical islands are situated within the bounds of the Australian Plate and have been geographically associated with Southeast Asia, due to their proximity to western Indonesia. Both were uninhabited when discovered by Europeans during the 17th century. Approximately half of the population on these islands are European Australian mainlanders (with smaller numbers being European New Zealanders), while the other half are immigrants from China or the nearby Malay archipelago. The UN further define the subregion as including Australia's Indian Ocean external territory Heard Island and McDonald Islands. These islands lie on the Antarctic Plate and are also thought of as being in Antarctica or no region at all, due to their extreme geographical isolation. The World Factbook define Heard Island and McDonald Islands as part of Antarctica, while placing Christmas Island and Cocos (Keeling) Islands as the westernmost extent of Oceania.

Norfolk Island, an external territory of Australia, was inhabited in prehistoric times by either Melanesians or Polynesians, and is geographically adjacent to the islands of Melanesia. The current inhabitants are mostly European Australians, and the UN categorize it as being in the Australasia subregion. The 1982 edition of the South Pacific Handbook, by David Stanley, groups Australia, New Zealand, Norfolk Island, and Hawaii together under an "Anglonesia" category. This is in spite of the geographical distance separating these areas from Hawaii, which technically lies in the North Pacific. The 1985 edition of the South Pacific Handbook also groups the Galápagos Islands as being in Polynesia, while noting that they are not culturally a part of the subregion. The islands are typically grouped with others in the southeastern Pacific that were never inhabited by Polynesians.

The Bonin Islands are in the same biogeographical realm as the geographically adjacent Micronesia, and are often grouped in with the subregion because of this.

History

Australia

Indigenous Australians are the original inhabitants of the Australian continent and nearby islands who migrated from Africa to Asia  70,000 years ago and arrived in Australia  50,000 years ago. They are believed to be among the earliest human migrations out of Africa. Although they likely migrated to Australia through Southeast Asia they are not demonstrably related to any known Asian or Polynesian population. There is evidence of genetic and linguistic interchange between Australians in the far north and the Austronesian peoples of modern-day New Guinea and the islands, but this may be the result of recent trade and intermarriage.

They reached Tasmania  40,000 years ago by migrating across a land bridge from the mainland that existed during the last ice age. It is believed that the first early human migration to Australia was achieved when this landmass formed part of the Sahul continent, connected to the island of New Guinea via a land bridge. The Torres Strait Islanders are indigenous to the Torres Strait Islands, which are at the northernmost tip of Queensland near Papua New Guinea. The earliest definite human remains found in Australia are that of Mungo Man, which have been dated at  40,000 years old.

Melanesia

The original inhabitants of the group of islands now named Melanesia were likely the ancestors of the present-day Papuan-speaking people. Migrating from South-East Asia, they appear to have occupied these islands as far east as the main islands in the Solomon Islands archipelago, including Makira and possibly the smaller islands farther to the east.

Particularly along the north coast of New Guinea and in the islands north and east of New Guinea, the Austronesian people, who had migrated into the area somewhat more than 3,000 years ago, came into contact with these pre-existing populations of Papuan-speaking peoples. In the late 20th century, some scholars theorized a long period of interaction, which resulted in many complex changes in genetics, languages, and culture among the peoples.

Micronesia

Micronesia began to be settled several millennia ago, although there are competing theories about the origin and arrival of the first settlers. There are numerous difficulties with conducting archaeological excavations in the islands, due to their size, settlement patterns and storm damage. As a result, much evidence is based on linguistic analysis.

The earliest archaeological traces of civilization have been found on the island of Saipan, dated to 1500 BCE or slightly before. The ancestors of the Micronesians settled there over 4,000 years ago. A decentralized chieftain-based system eventually evolved into a more centralized economic and religious culture centered on Yap and Pohnpei. The prehistories of many Micronesian islands such as Yap are not known very well.

The first people of the Northern Mariana Islands navigated to the islands and discovered it at some period between 4000 BCE to 2000 BCE from South-East Asia. They became known as the Chamorros. Their language was named after them. The ancient Chamorro left a number of megalithic ruins, including Latte stone. The Refaluwasch or Carolinian people came to the Marianas in the 1800s from the Caroline Islands. Micronesian colonists gradually settled the Marshall Islands during the 2nd millennium BCE, with inter-island navigation made possible using traditional stick charts.

Polynesia

The Polynesian people are considered to be by linguistic, archaeological and human genetic ancestry a subset of the sea-migrating Austronesian people and tracing Polynesian languages places their prehistoric origins in the Malay Archipelago, and ultimately, in Taiwan. Between  3000 and 1000 BCE, speakers of Austronesian languages began spreading from Taiwan into Island South-East Asia, as tribes whose natives were thought to have arrived through South China  8,000 years ago to the edges of western Micronesia and on into Melanesia.

In the archaeological record there are well-defined traces of this expansion which allow the path it took to be followed and dated with some certainty. It is thought that by roughly 1400 BCE, "Lapita Peoples", so-named after their pottery tradition, appeared in the Bismarck Archipelago of north-west Melanesia.

Easter Islanders claimed that a chief Hotu Matuꞌa discovered the island in one or two large canoes with his wife and extended family. They are believed to have been Polynesian. Around 1200, Tahitian explorers discovered and began settling the area. This date range is based on glottochronological calculations and on three radiocarbon dates from charcoal that appears to have been produced during forest clearance activities. Moreover, a recent study which included radiocarbon dates from what is thought to be very early material suggests that the island was discovered and settled as recently as 1200.

European exploration

Oceania was first explored by Europeans from the 16th century onwards. Portuguese navigators, between 1512 and 1526, reached the Maluku Islands (by António de Abreu and Francisco Serrão in 1512), Timor, the Aru Islands (Martim A. Melo Coutinho), the Tanimbar Islands, some of the Caroline Islands (by Gomes de Sequeira in 1525), and west Papua New Guinea (by Jorge de Menezes in 1526). In 1519, a Spanish expedition led by Ferdinand Magellan sailed down the east coast of South America, found and sailed through the strait that bears his name and on 28 November 1520 entered the ocean which he named "Pacific". The three remaining ships, led by Magellan and his captains Duarte Barbosa and João Serrão, then sailed north and caught the trade winds which carried them across the Pacific to the Philippines where Magellan was killed. One surviving ship led by Juan Sebastián Elcano returned west across the Indian Ocean and the other went north in the hope of finding the westerlies and reaching Mexico. Unable to find the right winds, it was forced to return to the East Indies. The Magellan-Elcano expedition achieved the first circumnavigation of the world and reached the Philippines, the Mariana Islands, and other islands of Oceania.

From 1527 to 1595 a number of other large Spanish expeditions crossed the Pacific Ocean, leading to the arrival in Marshall Islands and Palau in the North Pacific, as well as Tuvalu, the Marquesas Islands, the Solomon Islands archipelago, the Cook Islands, and the Admiralty Islands in the South Pacific.

In the quest for Terra Australis, Spanish explorations in the 17th century, such as the expedition led by the Portuguese navigator Pedro Fernandes de Queirós, sailed to Pitcairn and Vanuatu archipelagos, and sailed the Torres Strait between Australia and New Guinea, named after navigator Luís Vaz de Torres. Willem Janszoon, made the first completely documented European landing in Australia (1606), in Cape York Peninsula. Abel Tasman circumnavigated and landed on parts of the Australian continental coast and discovered Van Diemen's Land (now Tasmania), New Zealand in 1642, and Fiji. He was the first known European explorer to reach these islands.

On 23 April 1770, British explorer James Cook made his first recorded direct observation of Aboriginal Australians at Brush Island near Bawley Point. On 29 April, Cook and crew made their first landfall on the mainland of the continent at a place now known as the Kurnell Peninsula. It is here that James Cook made first contact with an aboriginal tribe known as the Gweagal. His expedition became the first recorded Europeans to have encountered its eastern coastline of Australia.

European settlement and colonisation

In 1789, the mutiny on the Bounty against William Bligh led to several of the mutineers escaping the Royal Navy and settling on Pitcairn Islands, which later became a British colony. Britain also established colonies in Australia in 1788, New Zealand in 1840 and Fiji in 1872, with much of Oceania becoming part of the British Empire. The Gilbert Islands (now known as Kiribati) and the Ellice Islands (now known as Tuvalu) came under Britain's sphere of influence in the late 19th century.

French Catholic missionaries arrived on Tahiti in 1834; their expulsion in 1836 caused France to send a gunboat in 1838. In 1842, Tahiti and Tahuata were declared a French protectorate, to allow Catholic missionaries to work undisturbed. The capital of Papeetē was founded in 1843. On 24 September 1853, under orders from Napoleon III, Admiral Febvrier Despointes took formal possession of New Caledonia and Port-de-France (Nouméa) was founded 25 June 1854.

The Spanish explorer Alonso de Salazar landed in the Marshall Islands in 1529. They were named by Krusenstern, after English explorer John Marshall, who visited them together with Thomas Gilbert in 1788, en route from Botany Bay to Canton (two ships of the First Fleet). In 1905 the British government transferred some administrative responsibility over south-east New Guinea to Australia (which renamed the area "Territory of Papua"); and in 1906, transferred all remaining responsibility to Australia. The Marshall Islands were claimed by Spain in 1874. Germany established colonies in New Guinea in 1884, and Samoa in 1900. The United States also expanded into the Pacific, beginning with Baker Island and Howland Island in 1857, and with Hawaii becoming a U.S. territory in 1898. Disagreements between the US, Germany and UK over Samoa led to the Tripartite Convention of 1899.

Modern history

One of the first land offensives in Oceania was the Occupation of German Samoa in August 1914 by New Zealand forces. The campaign to take Samoa ended without bloodshed after over 1,000 New Zealanders landed on the German colony. Australian forces attacked German New Guinea in September 1914. A company of Australians and a British warship besieged the Germans and their colonial subjects, ending with a German surrender.

The attack on Pearl Harbor by the Japanese Imperial General Headquarters, was a surprise military strike conducted by the Imperial Japanese Navy against the United States naval base at Pearl Harbor, Hawaii, on the morning of 7 December 1941. The attack led to the United States' entry into World War II. The Japanese subsequently invaded New Guinea, Solomon Islands and other Pacific islands. The Japanese were turned back at the Battle of the Coral Sea and the Kokoda Track campaign before they were finally defeated in 1945. Some of the most prominent Oceanic battlegrounds were the Battle of Bita Paka, the Solomon Islands campaign, the Air raids on Darwin, the Kokada Track, and the Borneo campaign. The United States fought the Battle of Guam from 21 July to 10 August 1944, to recapture the island from Japanese military occupation.

Australia and New Zealand became dominions in the 20th century, adopting the Statute of Westminster Act in 1942 and 1947 respectively. In 1946, Polynesians were granted French citizenship and the islands' status was changed to an overseas territory; the islands' name was changed in 1957 to Polynésie Française (French Polynesia). Hawaii became a U.S. state in 1959. Fiji and Tonga became independent in 1970. On 1 May 1979, in recognition of the evolving political status of the Marshall Islands, the United States recognized the constitution of the Marshall Islands and the establishment of the Government of the Republic of the Marshall Islands. The South Pacific Forum was founded in 1971, which became the Pacific Islands Forum in 2000.

Geography 

Under a four subregion model, the islands of Oceania extend to New Guinea in the west, the Bonin Islands in the northwest, the Hawaiian Islands in the northeast, Easter Island and Sala y Gómez Island in the east, and Macquarie Island in the south. Excluded under most definitions of Oceania are the Pacific landmasses of Taiwan, the Ryukyu Islands, and the Japanese archipelago, which are all on the margins of Asia, as well as the Aleutian Islands and other Alaskan or Canadian islands. In its periphery, Oceania's islands would sprawl 28 degrees north to the Bonin Islands in the Northern Hemisphere, and 55 degrees south to Macquarie Island in the Southern Hemisphere.

Oceanian islands are of four basic types: continental islands, high islands, coral reefs and uplifted coral platforms. High islands are of volcanic origin, and many contain active volcanoes. Among these are Bougainville, Hawaii, and Solomon Islands.

Oceania is one of eight terrestrial biogeographic realms, which constitute the major ecological regions of the planet. Related to these concepts are Near Oceania, that part of western Island Melanesia which has been inhabited for tens of millennia, and Remote Oceania which is more recently settled. Although the majority of the Oceanian islands lie in the South Pacific, a few of them are not restricted to the Pacific Ocean – Kangaroo Island and Ashmore and Cartier Islands, for instance, are situated in the Southern Ocean and Indian Ocean, respectively, and Tasmania's west coast faces the Southern Ocean.
The coral reefs of the South Pacific are low-lying structures that have built up on basaltic lava flows under the ocean's surface. One of the most dramatic is the Great Barrier Reef off northeastern Australia with chains of reef patches. A second island type formed of coral is the uplifted coral platform, which is usually slightly larger than the low coral islands. Examples include Banaba (formerly Ocean Island) and Makatea in the Tuamotu group of French Polynesia.

Regions
Micronesia, which lies north of the equator and west of the International Date Line, includes the Mariana Islands in the northwest, the Caroline Islands in the center, the Marshall Islands to the west and the islands of Kiribati in the southeast.

Melanesia, to the southwest, includes New Guinea, the world's second largest island after Greenland and by far the largest of the Pacific islands. The other main Melanesian groups from north to south are the Bismarck Archipelago, the Solomon Islands, the Santa Cruz Islands, Vanuatu, Fiji and New Caledonia.

Polynesia, stretching from Hawaii in the north to New Zealand in the south, also encompasses Tuvalu, Tokelau, Samoa, Tonga, and the Kermadec Islands to the west, the Cook Islands, Society Islands and Austral Islands in the center, and the Marquesas Islands, the Tuamotus, Mangareva Islands, and Easter Island to the east.

Australasia comprises Australia, New Zealand, the island of New Guinea, and neighbouring islands in the Pacific Ocean. Along with India most of Australasia lies on the Indo-Australian Plate with the latter occupying the Southern area. It is flanked by the Indian Ocean to the west and the Southern Ocean to the south.

Geology

The Pacific Plate, which makes up most of Oceania, is an oceanic tectonic plate that lies beneath the Pacific Ocean. At , it is the largest tectonic plate. The plate contains an interior hot spot forming the Hawaiian Islands. It is almost entirely oceanic crust. The oldest member disappearing by way of the plate tectonics cycle is early-Cretaceous (145 to 137 million years ago).

Australia is part of the Indo-Australian plate and is the lowest, flattest, and oldest landmass on Earth and it has had a relatively stable geological history. Geological forces such as tectonic uplift of mountain ranges or clashes between tectonic plates occurred mainly in Australia's early history, when it was still a part of Gondwana. Australia is situated in the middle of the tectonic plate, has occasional middle-sized earthquakes, and currently has no active volcanism (but some volcanoes in southeast Australia erupted within the last 10,000 years).

The geology of New Zealand is noted for its volcanic activity, earthquakes, and geothermal areas because of its position on the boundary of the Australian Plate and Pacific Plates. Much of the basement rock of New Zealand was once part of the super-continent of Gondwana, along with South America, Africa, Madagascar, India, Antarctica and Australia. The rocks that now form the continent of Zealandia were nestled between Eastern Australia and Western Antarctica.

The Australia-New Zealand continental fragment of Gondwana split from the rest of Gondwana in the late Cretaceous time (95–90 Ma). By 75 Ma, Zealandia was essentially separate from Australia and Antarctica, although only shallow seas might have separated Zealandia and Australia in the north. The Tasman Sea, and part of Zealandia then locked together with Australia to form the Australian Plate (40 Ma), and a new plate boundary was created between the Australian Plate and Pacific Plate.

Most islands in the Pacific are high islands (volcanic islands), such as, Easter Island, American Samoa and Fiji, among others, having peaks up to 1300 m rising abruptly from the shore. The Northwestern Hawaiian Islands were formed  7 to 30 million years ago, as shield volcanoes over the same volcanic hotspot that formed the Emperor Seamounts to the north and the Main Hawaiian Islands to the south.

Flora

The most diverse country of Oceania when it comes to the environment is Australia, with tropical rainforests in the north-east, mountain ranges in the south-east, south-west and east, and dry desert in the centre. Desert or semi-arid land commonly known as the outback makes up by far the largest portion of land. The coastal uplands and a belt of Brigalow grasslands lie between the coast and the mountains, while inland of the dividing range are large areas of grassland. The northernmost point of the east coast is the tropical-rainforested Cape York Peninsula.

Prominent features of the Australian flora are adaptations to aridity and fire which include scleromorphy and serotiny. These adaptations are common in species from the large and well-known families Proteaceae (Banksia), Myrtaceae (Eucalyptus – gum trees), and Fabaceae (Acacia – wattle). The flora of Fiji, Solomon Islands, Vanuatu, and New Caledonia is tropical dry forest, with tropical vegetation that includes palm trees, premna protrusa, psydrax odorata, gyrocarpus americanus, and derris trifoliata.

New Zealand's landscape ranges from the fjord-like sounds of the southwest to the tropical beaches of the far north. South Island is dominated by the Southern Alps. There are 18 peaks of more than 3000 metres (9800 ft) in the South Island. Earthquakes are common, though usually not severe, averaging 3,000 per year. There is a wide variety of native trees, adapted to all the various micro-climates in New Zealand.

In Hawaii, one endemic plant, Brighamia, now requires hand-pollination because its natural pollinator is presumed to be extinct. The two species of Brighamia – B. rockii and B. insignis – are represented in the wild by around 120 individual plants. To ensure these plants set seed, biologists rappel down  cliffs to brush pollen onto their stigmas.

Fauna

The aptly named Pacific kingfisher is found in the Pacific Islands, as is the Red-vented bulbul, Polynesian starling, Brown goshawk, Pacific Swallow and the Cardinal myzomela, among others. Birds breeding on Pitcairn include the fairy tern, common noddy, and red-tailed tropicbird. The Pitcairn reed warbler, endemic to Pitcairn Island, was added to the endangered species list in 2008.

Native to Hawaii is the Hawaiian crow, which has been extinct in the wild since 2002. The brown tree snake is native to northern and eastern coasts of Australia, Papua New Guinea, Guam and Solomon Islands. Native to Australia, New Guinea and proximate islands are birds of paradise, honeyeaters, Australasian treecreeper, Australasian robin, kingfishers, butcherbirds, and bowerbirds.

A unique feature of Australia's fauna is the relative scarcity of native placental mammals, and dominance of the marsupials – a group of mammals that raise their young in a pouch, including the macropods, possums, and dasyuromorphs. The passerines of Australia, also known as songbirds or perching birds, include wrens, the magpie group, thornbills, corvids, pardalotes, lyrebirds. Predominant bird species in the country include the Australian magpie, Australian raven, the pied currawong, crested pigeons and the laughing kookaburra. The koala, emu, platypus and kangaroo are national animals of Australia, and the Tasmanian devil is also one of the well-known animals in the country. The goanna is a predatory lizard native to the Australian mainland.

The birds of New Zealand evolved into an avifauna that included a large number of endemic species. As an island archipelago New Zealand accumulated bird diversity and when Captain James Cook arrived in the 1770s he noted that the bird song was deafening. The mix includes species with unusual biology such as the kākāpō which is the world's only flightless, nocturnal, lek-breeding parrot, but also many species that are similar to neighboring land areas. Some of the more well known and distinctive bird species in New Zealand are the kiwi, kea, takahē, kakapo, mohua, tūī, and the bellbird. The tuatara is a notable reptile endemic to New Zealand.

Australia, New Zealand, New Guinea, Wallacea, and the islands of the Pacific Ocean collectively possess 42% of the world’s parrot species, including half of all Critically Endangered parrots, many of which are endemic to the region.

Climate

The Pacific Islands are ruled by a tropical rainforest and tropical savanna climate. In the tropical and subtropical Pacific, the El Niño Southern Oscillation (ENSO) affects weather conditions. In the tropical western Pacific, the monsoon and the related wet season during the summer months contrast with dry winds in the winter which blow over the ocean from the Asian landmass. November is the only month in which all the tropical cyclone basins are active.

To the southwest of the region, in the Australian landmass, the climate is mostly desert or semi-arid, with the southern coastal corners having a temperate climate, such as oceanic and humid subtropical climate in the east coast and Mediterranean climate in the west. The northern parts of the country have a tropical climate. Snow falls frequently on the highlands near the east coast, in the states of Victoria, New South Wales, Tasmania and in the Australian Capital Territory.

Most regions of New Zealand belong to the temperate zone with a maritime climate (Köppen climate classification: Cfb) characterised by four distinct seasons. Conditions vary from extremely wet on the West Coast of the South Island to almost semi-arid in Central Otago and subtropical in Northland. Snow falls in New Zealand's South Island and at higher altitudes in the North Island. It is extremely rare at sea level in the North Island.

Hawaii, although being in the tropics, experiences many different climates, depending on latitude and its geography. The island of Hawaii for example hosts 4 (out of 5 in total) climate groups on a surface as small as  according to the Köppen climate types: tropical, arid, temperate and polar. The Hawaiian Islands receive most of their precipitation during the winter months (October to April). A few islands in the northwest, such as Guam, are susceptible to typhoons in the wet season.

The highest recorded temperature in Oceania occurred in Oodnadatta, South Australia (2 January 1960), where the temperature reached . Pohnpei of the Senyavin Islands in Micronesia is the wettest settlement in Oceania, and one of the wettest places on earth, with annual recorded rainfall exceeding  each year in certain mountainous locations. The Big Bog on the island of Maui is the wettest place, receiving an average  each year.

Demographics

The linked map below shows the exclusive economic zones (EEZs) of the islands of Oceania and neighbouring areas, as a guide to the following table (there are few land boundaries that can be drawn on a map of the Pacific at this scale).

The demographic table below shows the subregions and countries of geopolitical Oceania. The countries and territories in this table are categorised according to the scheme for geographic subregions used by the United Nations. The information shown follows sources in cross-referenced articles; where sources differ, provisos have been clearly indicated. These territories and regions are subject to various additional categorisations, depending on the source and purpose of each description.

Largest city for regions
 Australasia (metro, urban or proper largest city: Sydney)
 Melanesia (metro, urban or proper largest city: Port Moresby)
 Micronesia (metro, urban or proper largest city: Tarawa)
 Polynesia (metro, urban or proper largest city: Honolulu)

Cities by metropolitan area

Religion

The predominant religion in Oceania is Christianity (73%). A 2011 survey found that 92% in Melanesia, 93% in Micronesia and 96% in Polynesia described themselves as Christians. Traditional religions are often animist, and prevalent among traditional tribes is the belief in spirits (masalai in Tok Pisin) representing natural forces. In the 2018 census, 37% of New Zealanders affiliated themselves with Christianity and 48% declared no religion. In the 2016 Census, 52% of the Australian population declared some variety of Christianity and 30% stated "no religion".

In recent Australian and New Zealand censuses, large proportions of the population say they belong to "no religion" (which includes atheism, agnosticism, deism, secular humanism). In Tonga, everyday life is heavily influenced by Polynesian traditions and especially by the Christian faith. The Ahmadiyya mosque in Marshall Islands is the only mosque in Micronesia. Another one in Tuvalu belongs to the same sect. The Baháʼí House of Worship in Tiapapata, Samoa, is one of seven designations administered in the Baháʼí Faith.

Other religions in the region include Islam, Buddhism and Hinduism, which are prominent minority religions in Australia and New Zealand. Judaism, Sikhism and Jainism are also present. Sir Isaac Isaacs was the first Australian-born Governor General of Australia and was the first Jewish vice-regal representative in the British Empire. Prince Philip Movement is followed around Yaohnanen village on the southern island of Tanna in Vanuatu.

Languages

Native languages of Oceania fall into three major geographic groups:
 The large Austronesian language family, with such languages as Malay (Indonesian), and Oceanic languages such as Gilbertese, Fijian, Māori, and Hawaiian
 The Aboriginal Australian languages, including the large Pama–Nyungan family
 The Papuan languages of New Guinea and neighbouring islands, including the large Trans–New Guinea family

Colonial languages include English in Australia, New Zealand, Hawaii, and many other territories; French in New Caledonia, French Polynesia, Wallis and Futuna; Japanese in the Bonin Islands; and Spanish on Easter Island and the Galápagos Islands. There are also Creoles formed from the interaction of Malay or the colonial languages with indigenous languages, such as Tok Pisin, Bislama, Chavacano, various Malay trade and creole languages, Hawaiian Pidgin, Norfuk, and Pitkern. Contact between Austronesian and Papuan resulted in several instances in mixed languages such as Maisin.

Immigrants brought their own languages to the region, such as Mandarin, Hindi, Italian, Arabic, Portuguese, Polish, German, Spanish, Russian, Korean, Cantonese and Greek, among many others, namely in Australia and New Zealand, or Fiji Hindi in Fiji.

Immigration

The most multicultural areas in Oceania, which have a high degree of immigration, are Australia, New Zealand, and Hawaii. Since 1945, more than 7 million people have settled in Australia. From the late 1970s, there was a significant increase in immigration from Asian and other non-European countries, making Australia a multicultural country.

Sydney is the most multicultural city in Oceania, having more than 250 different languages spoken with about 40% of residents speaking a language other than English at home. Furthermore, 36 percent of the population reported having been born overseas, with top countries being Italy, Lebanon, Vietnam and Iraq, among others. Melbourne is also fairly multicultural, having the largest Greek-speaking population outside of Europe, and the second largest Asian population in Australia after Sydney.

European migration to New Zealand provided a major influx following the signing of the Treaty of Waitangi in 1840. Subsequent immigration has been chiefly from the British Isles, but also from continental Europe, the Pacific, The Americas and Asia. Auckland is home to over half (51.6 percent) of New Zealand's overseas born population, including 72 percent of the country's Pacific Island-born population, 64 percent of its Asian-born population, and 56 percent of its Middle Eastern and African born population.

Hawaii is a majority-minority state. Chinese workers on Western trading ships settled in Hawaii starting in 1789. In 1820, the first American missionaries arrived to preach Christianity and teach the Hawaiians Western ways. , a large proportion of Hawaii's population have Asian ancestry – especially Filipino, Japanese, Korean and Chinese. Many are descendants of immigrants brought to work on the sugarcane plantations in the mid-to-late 19th century. Almost 13,000 Portuguese immigrants had arrived by 1899; they also worked on the sugarcane plantations. Puerto Rican immigration to Hawaii began in 1899 when Puerto Rico's sugar industry was devastated by two hurricanes, causing a worldwide shortage of sugar and a huge demand for sugar from Hawaii.

Between 2001 and 2007 Australia's Pacific Solution policy transferred asylum seekers to several Pacific nations, including the Nauru detention centre. Australia, New Zealand, and other nations took part in the Regional Assistance Mission to Solomon Islands between 2003 and 2017 after a request for aid.

Archaeogenetics 
Archaeology, linguistics, and existing genetic studies indicate that Oceania was settled by two major waves of migration. The first migration of Australo-Melanesians took place  40 to 80 thousand years ago, and these migrants, Papuans, colonised much of Near Oceania. Approximately 3.5 thousand years ago, a second expansion of Austronesian speakers arrived in Near Oceania, and the descendants of these people spread to the far corners of the Pacific, colonising Remote Oceania.

Mitochondrial DNA (mtDNA) studies quantify the magnitude of the Austronesian expansion and demonstrate the homogenising effect of this expansion. With regards to Papuan influence, autochthonous haplogroups support the hypothesis of a long history in Near Oceania, with some lineages suggesting a time depth of 60 thousand years. Santa Cruz, a population located in Remote Oceania, is an anomaly with extreme frequencies of autochthonous haplogroups of Near Oceanian origin.

Large areas of New Guinea are unexplored by scientists and anthropologists due to extensive forestation and mountainous terrain. Known indigenous tribes in Papua New Guinea have very little contact with local authorities aside from the authorities knowing who they are. Many remain preliterate and, at the national or international level, the names of tribes and information about them is extremely hard to obtain. The Indonesian provinces of Papua and West Papua on the island of New Guinea are home to an estimated 44 uncontacted tribal groups.

Economy

Australia

Australia and New Zealand are the only highly developed independent nations in the region, although the economy of Australia is by far the largest and most dominant economy in the region and one of the largest in the world. New Caledonia, Hawaii, and French Polynesia are highly developed too but are not sovereign states. Australia's per-capita GDP is higher than that of the UK, Canada, Germany, and France in terms of purchasing power parity. New Zealand is also one of the most globalised economies and depends greatly on international trade.

The Australian Securities Exchange in Sydney is the largest stock exchange in Australia and in the South Pacific. In 2012, Australia was the 12th largest national economy by nominal GDP and the 19th-largest measured by PPP-adjusted GDP.

Mercer Quality of Living Survey ranks Sydney tenth in the world in terms of quality of living, making it one of the most livable cities. It is classified as an Alpha+ World City by GaWC. Melbourne also ranked highly in the world's most liveable city list, and is a leading financial centre in the Asia-Pacific region. 

The majority of people living in Australia work in health care, retail and education sectors. Australia boasts the largest amount of manufacturing in the region, producing cars, electrical equipment, machinery and clothes.

New Zealand 

New Zealand's economy is the 53rd-largest in the world measured by nominal gross domestic product (GDP) and 68th-largest in the world measured by purchasing power parity (PPP). A major economic and cultural powerhouse of the Southern Hemisphere, Auckland is ranked as a Beta+ world city by the Globalization and World Cities Research Network. Auckland and Wellington are frequently ranked among the world's most liveable cities, with Auckland being ranked first in the world according to the Global Liveability Ranking.

New Zealand has a large GDP for its population of 5.2 million, and sources of revenue are spread throughout the large island nation. The country has one of the most globalised economies and depends greatly on international trade – mainly with Australia, Canada, China, the European Union, Japan, Singapore, South Korea and the United States. New Zealand's 1983 Closer Economic Relations agreement with Australia means that the economy aligns closely with that of Australia. In 2005, the World Bank praised New Zealand as the most business-friendly country in the world. The economy diversified and by 2008, tourism had become the single biggest generator of foreign exchange. The New Zealand dollar is the 10th-most traded currency in the world.

Pacific Islands

The overwhelming majority of people living in the Pacific islands work in the service industry which includes tourism, education and financial services. Oceania's largest export markets include Japan, China, the United States and South Korea. The smallest Pacific nations rely on trade with Australia, New Zealand and the United States for exporting goods and for accessing other products. Australia and New Zealand's trading arrangements are known as Closer Economic Relations. Australia and New Zealand, along with other countries, are members of Asia-Pacific Economic Cooperation (APEC) and the East Asia Summit (EAS), which may become trade blocs in the future particularly EAS.

The main produce from the Pacific is copra or coconut, but timber, beef, palm oil, cocoa, sugar, and ginger are also commonly grown across the tropics of the Pacific. Fishing provides a major industry for many of the smaller nations in the Pacific, although many fishing areas are exploited by other larger countries, namely Japan. Natural Resources, such as lead, zinc, nickel, and gold, are mined in Australia and Solomon Islands. Oceania's largest export markets include Japan, China, the United States, India, South Korea and the European Union.

Endowed with forest, mineral, and fish resources, Fiji is one of the most developed of the Pacific island economies, though it remains a developing country with a large subsistence agriculture sector. Agriculture accounts for 18% of gross domestic product, although it employed some 70% of the workforce as of 2001. Sugar exports and the growing tourist industry are the major sources of foreign exchange. Sugar cane processing makes up one-third of industrial activity. Coconuts, ginger, and copra are also significant.

The history of Hawaii's economy can be traced through a succession of dominant industries; sandalwood, whaling, sugarcane, pineapple, the military, tourism and education. Hawaiian exports include food and clothing. These industries play a small role in the Hawaiian economy, due to the shipping distance to viable markets, such as the West Coast of the contiguous U.S. The state's food exports include coffee, macadamia nuts, pineapple, livestock, sugarcane and honey. , Honolulu was ranked high on world livability rankings, and was also ranked as the 2nd safest city in the U.S.

Tourism

Tourists mostly come from Japan, the United Kingdom and the United States. Fiji currently attracts almost half a million tourists each year, more than a quarter of whom come from Australia. This has contributed $1 billion or more to Fiji's economy since 1995, but the Government of Fiji likely underestimates these figures due to the invisible economy inside the tourism industry.

Vanuatu is widely recognised as one of the premier vacation destinations for scuba divers wishing to explore coral reefs of the South Pacific region. Tourism has been promoted, in part, by Vanuatu being the site of several reality-TV shows. The ninth season of the reality TV series Survivor was filmed on Vanuatu, entitled Survivor: Vanuatu – Islands of Fire. Two years later, Australia's Celebrity Survivor was filmed at the same location used by the U.S. version.

Tourism in Australia is an important component of the Australian economy. In the financial year 2014/15, tourism represented 3% of Australia's GDP contributing A$47.5 billion to the national economy. In 2015, there were 7.4 million visitor arrivals. Popular Australian destinations include the Sydney Harbour (Sydney Opera House, Sydney Harbour Bridge, Royal Botanic Garden, etc.), Gold Coast (theme parks such as Warner Bros. Movie World, Dreamworld and Sea World), Walls of Jerusalem National Park and Mount Field National Park in Tasmania, Royal Exhibition Building in Melbourne, the Great Barrier Reef in Queensland, The Twelve Apostles in Victoria, Uluru (Ayers Rock) and the Australian outback.

Tourism in New Zealand contributes NZ$7.3 billion (or 4%) of the country's GDP in 2013, as well as directly supporting 110,800 full-time equivalent jobs (nearly 6% of New Zealand's workforce). International tourist spending accounted for 16% of New Zealand's export earnings (nearly NZ$10 billion). International and domestic tourism contributes, in total, NZ$24 billion to New Zealand's economy every year. Tourism New Zealand, the country's official tourism agency, is actively promoting the country as a destination worldwide. Milford Sound in South Island is acclaimed as New Zealand's most famous tourist destination.

In 2003 alone, according to state government data, there were over 6.4 million visitors to the Hawaiian Islands with expenditures of over $10.6 billion. Due to the mild year-round weather, tourist travel is popular throughout the year. In 2011, Hawaii saw increasing arrivals and share of foreign tourists from Canada, Australia, and China increasing 13%, 24% and 21% respectively from 2010.

Politics

Australia

Australia is a federal parliamentary constitutional monarchy with Charles III at its apex as the King of Australia, a role that is distinct from his position as monarch of the other Commonwealth realms. The King is represented in Australia by the Governor-General at the federal level and by the Governors at the state level, who by convention act on the advice of his ministers. There are two major political groups that usually form government, federally and in the states: the Australian Labor Party and the Coalition which is a formal grouping of the Liberal Party and its minor partner, the National Party. Within Australian political culture, the Coalition is considered centre-right and the Labor Party is considered centre-left. The Australian Defence Force is by far the largest military force in Oceania.

New Zealand

New Zealand is a constitutional monarchy with a parliamentary democracy, although its constitution is not codified. Charles III is the King of New Zealand and the head of state. The King is represented by the Governor-General, whom he appoints on the advice of the Prime Minister. The New Zealand Parliament holds legislative power and consists of the King and the House of Representatives. A parliamentary general election must be called no later than three years after the previous election. New Zealand is identified as one of the world's most stable and well-governed states, with high government transparency and among the lowest perceived levels of corruption.

Pacific Islands

In Samoan politics, the Prime Minister of Samoa is the head of government. The 1960 constitution, which formally came into force with independence from New Zealand in 1962, builds on the British pattern of parliamentary democracy, modified to take account of Samoan customs. The national government (malo) generally controls the legislative assembly. Politics of Tonga takes place in a framework of a constitutional monarchy, whereby the King of Tonga is the Head of State.

Fiji has a multiparty system with the Prime Minister of Fiji as head of government. The executive power is exercised by the government. Legislative power is vested in both the government and the Parliament of Fiji. Fiji's Head of State is the President. He is elected by Parliament of Fiji after nomination by the Prime Minister or the Leader of the Opposition, for a three-year term.

In the politics of Papua New Guinea the Prime Minister is the head of government, and the head of state is the monarch of the United Kingdom, represented by a Governor-General. In Kiribati, a Parliamentary regime, the President of Kiribati is the head of state and government, and of a multi-party system.

New Caledonia remains an integral part of the French Republic. Inhabitants of New Caledonia are French citizens and carry French passports. They take part in the legislative and presidential French elections. New Caledonia sends two representatives to the French National Assembly and two senators to the French Senate.

Hawaii is dominated by the Democratic Party. As codified in the Hawaiian Constitution, there are three branches of government: executive, legislative and judicial. The governor is elected statewide. The lieutenant governor acts as the Secretary of State. The governor and lieutenant governor oversee twenty agencies and departments from offices in the State Capitol.

Culture

Australia

Since 1788, the primary influence behind Australian culture has been Anglo-Celtic Western culture, with some Indigenous influences. The divergence and evolution that has occurred in the ensuing centuries has resulted in a distinctive Australian culture. Since the mid-20th century, American popular culture has strongly influenced Australia, particularly through television and cinema. Other cultural influences come from neighbouring Asian countries, and through large-scale immigration from non-English-speaking nations. The Story of the Kelly Gang (1906), the world's first feature length film, spurred a boom in Australian cinema during the silent film era. The Australian Museum in Sydney and the National Gallery of Victoria in Melbourne are the oldest and largest museums in Oceania. The city's New Year's Eve celebrations are the largest in Oceania.

Australia is also known for its cafe and coffee culture in urban centres. Australia and New Zealand were responsible for the flat white coffee. Most Indigenous Australian tribal groups subsisted on a simple hunter-gatherer diet of native fauna and flora, otherwise called bush tucker. The first settlers introduced British food to the continent, much of which is now considered typical Australian food, such as the Sunday roast. Multicultural immigration transformed Australian cuisine; post-World War II European migrants, particularly from the Mediterranean, helped to build a thriving Australian coffee culture, and the influence of Asian cultures has led to Australian variants of their staple foods, such as the Chinese-inspired dim sim and Chiko Roll.

Hawaii

The music of Hawaii includes traditional and popular styles, ranging from native Hawaiian folk music to modern rock and hip hop. Hawaii's musical contributions to the music of the United States are out of proportion to the state's small size. Styles such as slack-key guitar are well known worldwide, while Hawaiian-tinged music is a frequent part of Hollywood soundtracks. Hawaii also made a major contribution to country music with the introduction of the steel guitar. The Hawaiian religion is polytheistic and animistic, with a belief in many deities and spirits, including the belief that spirits are found in non-human beings and objects such as animals, the waves, and the sky.

The cuisine of Hawaii is a fusion of many foods brought by immigrants to the Hawaiian Islands, including the earliest Polynesians and native Hawaiians, and American, Chinese, Filipino, Japanese, Korean, Polynesian, and Portuguese origins. Native Hawaiian musician and Hawaiian sovereignty activist Israel Kamakawiwoʻole, famous for his medley of "Somewhere Over the Rainbow/What a Wonderful World", was named "The Voice of Hawaii" by NPR in 2010 in its 50 great voices series.

New Zealand

New Zealand as a culture is a Western culture, which is influenced by the cultural input of the indigenous Māori and the various waves of multi-ethnic migration which followed the British colonisation of New Zealand. The Māori people constitute one of the major cultures of Polynesia. The country has been broadened by globalisation and immigration specifically from Oceania, Europe, and Asia. New Zealand marks two national days of remembrance, Waitangi Day and ANZAC Day, and also celebrates many holidays such as the Queen's Birthday, Labour Day, and Christmas Day, as well as public anniversaries of the founding dates of most regions. The New Zealand recording industry began to develop from 1940 onwards and many New Zealand musicians have obtained success in Britain and the United States. Some artists release Māori language songs and the Māori tradition-based art of kapa haka (song and dance) has made a resurgence. The country's diverse scenery and compact size, plus government incentives, have encouraged some producers to film big budget movies in New Zealand, including Avatar, The Lord of the Rings, The Hobbit, The Chronicles of Narnia, King Kong and The Last Samurai.

The national cuisine has been described as Pacific Rim, incorporating the native Māori cuisine and diverse culinary traditions introduced by settlers and immigrants from Europe, Polynesia and Asia. New Zealand yields produce from land and sea – most crops and livestock, such as maize, potatoes and pigs, were gradually introduced by the early European settlers. Distinctive ingredients or dishes include lamb; salmon; koura (crayfish); whitebait; shellfish including dredge oysters, paua, mussels, scallops, pipi and tuatua; kumara (sweet potato); kiwifruit; tamarillo; and pavlova (considered a national dish).

Samoa

The fa'a Samoa, or traditional Samoan way, remains a strong force in Samoan life and politics. Despite centuries of European influence, Samoa maintains its historical customs, social and political systems, and language. Cultural customs such as the Samoa 'ava ceremony are significant and solemn rituals at important occasions including the bestowal of matai chiefly titles. Items of great cultural value include the finely woven 'ie toga.

The Samoan word for dance is siva, which consists of unique gentle movements of the body in time to music and which tell a story. Samoan male dances can be more snappy. The sasa is also a traditional dance where rows of dancers perform rapid synchronised movements in time to the rhythm of wooden drums (pate) or rolled mats. Another dance performed by males is called the fa'ataupati or the slap dance, creating rhythmic sounds by slapping different parts of the body. As with other Polynesian cultures (Hawaiian, Tahitian and Māori) with significant and unique tattoos, Samoans have two gender specific and culturally significant tattoos.

Arts

The artistic creations of native Oceanians varies greatly throughout the cultures and regions. The subject matter typically carries themes of fertility or the supernatural. Petroglyphs, tattooing, painting, wood carving, stone carving, and textile work are other common art forms. Art of Oceania properly encompasses the artistic traditions of the people indigenous to Australia and the Pacific Islands. These early peoples lacked a writing system, and made works on perishable materials, so few records of them exist from this time.

Indigenous Australian rock art is the oldest and richest unbroken tradition of art in the world, dating as far back as 60,000 years and spread across hundreds of thousands of sites. These rock paintings served several functions. Some were used in magic, others to increase animal populations for hunting, while some were simply for amusement. Sculpture in Oceania first appears on New Guinea as a series of stone figures found throughout the island, but mostly in mountainous highlands. Establishing a chronological timeframe for these pieces in most cases is difficult, but one has been dated to  1500 BCE.

By 1500 BCE the Lapita culture, descendants of the second wave, would begin to expand and spread into the more remote islands. At around the same time, art began to appear in New Guinea, including the earliest examples of sculpture in Oceania. Beginning  1100 CE, the people of Easter Island would begin construction of nearly 900 moai (large stone statues). At  1200 CE, the people of Pohnpei, a Micronesian island, would embark on another megalithic construction, building Nan Madol, a city of artificial islands and a system of canals. Hawaiian art includes wood carvings, feather work, petroglyphs, bark cloth (called kapa in Hawaiian and tapa elsewhere in the Pacific), and tattoos. Native Hawaiians had neither metal nor woven cloth.

Sport

Rugby union is one of the region's most prominent sports, and is the national sport of New Zealand, Samoa, Fiji and Tonga. The most popular overall sport in Australia is cricket, with their national team having won the Cricket World Cup a record five times. The most popular sport among Australian women is netball, while Australian rules football garners the highest spectatorship numbers and television ratings. Rugby union is the most popular sport among New Zealanders, and they are tied with South Africa for the most Rugby World Cup titles, having won the tournament three times. Australia's team the Wallabies have also managed to win the World Cup twice, despite Rugby union being less popular among Australians. In Papua New Guinea, the most popular sport is Rugby league. Fiji's sevens team is one of the most successful in the world, as is New Zealand's.

Australian rules football is the national sport in Nauru. It has a large following in Papua New Guinea, where it is the second most popular sport after Rugby League. Additionally, it attracts significant attention across New Zealand and the Pacific Islands. The highest level of the sport is the Australian Football League (AFL), which was the fourth best attended sporting league in the world during the 2010s.

Vanuatu is the only country in Oceania to call association football its national sport. However, it is also the most popular sport in Kiribati, Solomon Islands and Tuvalu, and has a significant (and growing) popularity in Australia. In 2006 Australia left the Oceania Football Confederation (OFC) for the Asian Football Confederation (AFC), and their men's team the Socceroos have qualified for every subsequent FIFA World Cup as an Asian entrant. The sole Micronesian country with membership in the OFC is Kiribati, although they are not recognized by FIFA like the other OFC members. Federated States of Micronesia, Marshall Islands, Nauru and Palau all have no presence, primarily due to lack of infrastructure and logistical difficulties related to Micronesia's remoteness. Like Australia, the Micronesian dependent territories of Guam and Northern Mariana Islands currently compete in the AFC instead of the OFC. The OFC was dominated by Australia for many years, and became known for one-sided results. These included a 31–0 defeat of American Samoa by Australia in 2001, which remains the biggest international victory in the history of the sport. It broke the previous record set two days earlier when Australia defeated Tonga 22–0.

Australians view sport as an important part of their cultural identity, and the country performs well on the international stage, despite having a relatively small population. They have hosted two Summer Olympics: Melbourne 1956 and Sydney 2000, and the city of Brisbane is also set to host the 2032 edition. Australia (and New Zealand) were among the small handful of non-communist countries who decided to participate at Moscow 1980. Additionally, Australia has hosted five editions of the Commonwealth Games (Sydney 1938, Perth 1962, Brisbane 1982, Melbourne 2006, Gold Coast 2018). Meanwhile, New Zealand has hosted the Commonwealth Games three times: Auckland 1950, Christchurch 1974 and Auckland 1990. The Pacific Games (formerly known as the South Pacific Games) is a multi-sport event, much like the Olympics on a much smaller scale, with participation exclusively from countries around the Pacific. It is held every four years and began in 1963. Australia and New Zealand competed in the games for the first time in 2015.

Melbourne hosts the Australian Open every year, considered one of the four major Grand Slam tournaments in tennis. It was held for the first time in 1905.

See also

 Australasia
 Europeans in Oceania
 Festival of Pacific Arts
 Flags of Oceania
 Insular Chile
 List of cities in Oceania
 Oceania (journal)
 Oceanic cuisine
 Indigenous peoples of Oceania
 Pacific Islander
 Pacific Union
 The Pacific Community
 United Nations geoscheme for Oceania

References

Further reading
 
 Frank Harary & Per Hage (1991) Exchange in Oceania: A Graph Theoretic Analysis, Oxford Studies in Social and Cultural Anthropology, Oxford University Press.
 Frank Harary & Per Hage (2007) Island Networks: Communication, Kinship, and Classification Structures in Oceania, Structural Analysis in the Social Sciences, Cambridge University Press.

External links

 
 "Australia and Oceania" from National Geographic
 Oceania photographs, recordings, and digital objects drawn primarily from the Tuzin Archive for Melanesian Anthropology at the UC San Diego Library.

Oceania
Continents
Asia-Pacific
Pacific Ocean
Southern Ocean
Indian Ocean